Wang Lixiong (born 2 May 1953) is a Chinese writer and scholar, best known for his political prophecy fiction, Yellow Peril, and for his writings on Tibet and provocative analysis of China's western region of Xinjiang.

Wang is regarded as one of the most outspoken dissidents, democracy activists, and reformers in China. He is married to Woeser, a Tibetan poet and essayist.

Early life and education

Wang Lixiong was born in 1953 at Changchun in Jilin province. His mother was a playwright with the Changchun Film Group Corporation and his father, Wang Shaolin, was the vice president of China First Automobile Works, and committed suicide in 1968 after being imprisoned during the Cultural Revolution.

Wang was sent to countryside for four years from 1969 to 1973 following Mao Zedong's Down to the Countryside Movement. In 1973, he was admitted into Jilin University of Technology, and was assigned to work in China First Automobile Works after graduation.

Writings

In 1991, Yellow Peril was published by Mirror Books under pseudonym Bao Mi (Mandarin for "Kept Secret"), painted an apocalyptic scenario in which civil war erupts between north and south China - with Nationalist-ruled Taiwan backing the south - and ends in nuclear conflict and millions of starving refugees spilling across borders.  For years, the author of one of the best-selling novels in the Chinese-speaking world was known simply to readers as "Bao Mi", for Wang’s own protection because he broke taboos and spelled China's doomsday. Yellow Peril was recently translated into English as China Tidal Wave.

Beginning with his solitary adventure rafting across Tibet plateau along the upper reaches of Yellow River in 1984, and after more than a decade study of Tibet during which he had been to Tibet dozens of times and lived in that region for more than two years, Wang finished his book Sky Burial: The Fate of Tibet in 1998. The book, with the honest and unbiased views through investigation of histories, detailed analysis of issues and comprehensive supporting data, immediately won him high regards from both the supporters of Chinese government and followers of The Dalai Lama, and became a mandate in Tibet study.

From 1991 to 1994, he wrote a book of political theory, Dissolving Power: A Successive Multi-Level Electoral System, which drew tremendous disruptive responses although he himself valued it the most – some believed it offers a promising solution that China could and should adopt for a smooth transition towards democracy, some think it is purely a dream of utopia.

After ten more years of further study in progressive democracy, he completed another political theory book Bottom up Democracies in 2006. Realizing that it is not possible to promote his theory in China and make it a political reality, he started to research on internet development trying to find the linchpin which will connect his theory with real world.

Social activities

In 1994, Wang Lixiong initiated as one of the founders The Friends of Nature, an environment protection organization, the first non-governmental organization in China, was forced to resign in 2003 on the request from Chinese government.

To support Tenzin Delek Rinpoche, an important Tibetan Lama of the region of Litang who was accused of being involved in a bomb attack and sentenced to death penalty, On December 13, 2002 Wang Lixiong and 24 other Chinese intellectuals issued a petition requesting the right to appoint independent lawyers for Rinpoche's trial, as well as the right for local and international media to cover the trial and interview Chinese government officials; in addition, the petition called for representatives of the Tibetan community in exile to attend the proceedings.

In 2001, Wang issued a public statement on his decision to resign from Chine Writers Association: “It is not only acquiescence which is demanded, but also the annihilation of the whole personality, of all conscience and of all individual pride, that we are being made into crouching dogs. Belonging to this organization is no longer an honor, on the contrary, is a shame of any writer worthy of the name”.

Believing that the Dalai Lama is the key to resolve the issues of Tibet[1], [2], Wang Lixiong, together with other Chinese intellectuals, strongly urged Chinese authorities to take the Middle Way approach proposed by the Dalai Lama into serious consideration as it showed the deepest sincerity from the Dalai lama, should be treated as the basis for any further negotiations for the future of Tibet. He was invited 4 times to meet with the Dalai Lama with regard to this matter. His analysis of Middle Way was elaborated in his work Unlocking Tibet.[3] And his meeting with the Dalai Lama was documented in his article Dialogues with the Dalai Lama.

In the wake of Tibet riot on 3/10/2008, Wang, with the support from the pro-democracy activities in China, urged the Chinese government to invite UN investigators to Tibet to change the international community’s distrust of China, and on March 22, 2008, issued a 12-point petition about the situation in Tibet.

Arrest and imprisonment
Wang first began to study Xinjiang in 1999. When conducting research for a book following the same suit of Sky Burial: The Fate of Tibet, he was arrested for photocopying an internal publication - stamped as “secret” -  of Xinjiang Production and Construction Corps. Refusing to recant or promise collaboration in order to obtain his release, he attempted suicide in the high-security prison in Miquan . He recorded the incident in a short essay entitled Memories of Xinjiang published in 2001. In prison, he shared a cell with a Uyghur prisoner arrested in Beijing for organizing a demonstration protesting discrimination (Mokhtar), with whom he entered into a long and ongoing discussion on Xinjiang which formed the backbone of his book My West China; Your East Turkestan published in 2007. In this book, Wang concluded that Xinjiang’s issues had dangerously “Palestinized.” The Xinjiang riot in July 2009 proved his fear.

Wang would be placed under house arrest whenever there were sensitive incidents or events. i.e. the outbreak of anti-Chinese protests in Tibet in March 2008.

Awards and honors

2009	Light of Truth Award honored by the Dalai Lama on behalf of ICT

2007	Honorary membership, Chinese Studies Association of New Zealand

2003	Hellman-Hammett Grants, Human Rights Watch

2002	Freedom of Expression Award, Independent Chinese Pen Association

2002	Visiting Scholarship, US Congress

1999	The 100 Most Influential Chinese Novels in 20th Century (Yellow Peril ranked 41st), Asia Weekly

Works

Books

2009	Voices from Tibet, Lotus Publishing (co-authored with Tsering Woeser)

2009	Sky Burial: The Fate of Tibet, 2nd Edition, Lotus Publishing

2009	The Struggle for Tibet, Verso Publishing (co-authored with Tsering Shakya)

2008	China Tidal Wave  (English edition of Yellow Peril translated by Anton Platero), Global Oriental Ltd.

2008	Yellow Peril, New Century Edition, Lotus Publishing

2007	The Ceremony, Da kuai wen Publishing

2007	My West China; Your East Turkestan, Lotus Publishing

2006	Bottom-up Democracy, Lotus Publishing

2006	Unlocking Tibet, Tersey Tsultim Publishing

2002	Dialogue with Dalai Lama, Renjian Publishing

2002	The Spiritual Journey of a Free Soul, China Movie Publishing

1998	Dissolving Power: A Successive Multi-Level Electoral System, Mirror Books Publishing

1998	Sky Burial: The Destiny of Tibet, Mirror Books Publishing

1991	Yellow Peril , Mirror Books Publishing

1988	Drifting, Huacheng Publishing

1984	Gate to Heaven, Huacheng Publishing

Major essays

2010    Democracy 2.0 - From Direct Democracy to Vector Democracy 民主2.0——从数量民主到矢量民主

2008	History of Tibetan-Chinese Relations 

2008	Roadmap of Tibet Independence

2009	Mappō

2004	The Two Types of Imperialism That Tibet Encounters

2002	Reflections on Tibet 

2000	A Successive Multilevel Electoral System vs. a Representative Democratic System: Comparison on Resolutions for Tibet Issues 

Columnist contribution
2004–Present: Radio Free Asia, Washington D.C.
2002: Ming Pao, Hong Kong

External links
 Wang Lixiong's English Blog
 The repository of Wang Lixiong's Articles
 族群对话与新媒体
 Entry in  The Encyclopedia of Science Fiction

Notes and references

1953 births
Living people
Tibetan Buddhists from China
Jilin University alumni
Writers from Changchun
Chinese male novelists
People's Republic of China novelists